SWI/SNF-related matrix-associated actin-dependent regulator of chromatin subfamily B member 1 is a protein that in humans is encoded by the SMARCB1 gene.

Function 

The protein encoded by this gene is part of a complex that relieves repressive chromatin structures, allowing the transcriptional machinery to access its targets more effectively. The encoded nuclear protein may also bind to and enhance the DNA joining activity of HIV-1 integrase. This gene has been found to be a tumor suppressor and mutations in it have been associated with malignant rhabdoid tumors. Two transcript variants encoding different isoforms have been found for this gene.

Interactions 

SMARCB1 has been shown to interact with:

 ARID1A,
 BAZ1B, 
 BRCA1, 
 CREB-binding protein, 
 Cyclin-dependent kinase 8, 
 Myc,
 P53, 
 POLR2A, 
 PPP1CA, 
 PPP1CB, 
 PPP1CC, 
 PPP1R15A, 
 SMARCA2, 
 SMARCA4, 
 SMARCC1, 
 SMARCE1, 
 SS18,  and
 XPO1.

References

Further reading

External links